The iPhone X (Roman numeral "X" pronounced "ten", also known as iPhone 10) is a smartphone designed, developed and marketed by Apple Inc. It is part of the eleventh generation of the iPhone. Available for pre-order from October 27, 2017, it was released on November 3, 2017. The naming of the iPhone X (skipping the iPhone 9) is to mark the 10th anniversary of the iPhone.

The iPhone X used a glass and stainless-steel form factor and "bezel-less" design, shrinking the bezels while not having a "chin", unlike many Android phones. It was the first iPhone to use an OLED screen. The home button's fingerprint sensor was replaced with a new type of authentication called Face ID, which used sensors to scan the user's face to unlock the device. This face-recognition capability also enabled emojis to be animated following the user's expression (Animoji). With a bezel-less design, iPhone user interaction changed significantly, using gestures to navigate the operating system rather than the home button used in all previous iPhones. At the time of its November 2017 launch, its price tag of US$999 also made it the most expensive iPhone ever, with even higher prices internationally due to additional local sales and import taxes.

Along with the iPhone 6S, its Plus variant, and the first-generation iPhone SE, the iPhone X was discontinued on September 12, 2018, following the announcement of the iPhone XS, iPhone XS Max and iPhone XR devices.

On November 22, 2018, Apple reportedly resumed production of the iPhone X due to weak sales of its successors. The iPhone X remains discontinued.

History 
The technology behind the iPhone X was in development for five years, starting as far back as 2012. Rumors of a drastic iPhone redesign began circulating around the time of iPhone 7 announcement in the third quarter of 2016, and intensified when a HomePod firmware leak in July 2017 suggested that Apple would shortly release a phone with a nearly bezel-less design, lack of a physical home button, facial recognition, and other new features. A near-final development version of the iOS 11 operating system was also leaked in September 2017, confirming the new design and features.

On August 31, 2017, Apple invited journalists to a September 12 press event, the first public event held at the Steve Jobs Theater on the company's new Apple Park campus in Cupertino, California. The iPhone X was unveiled during that keynote. Its US$999 starting price was the most expensive iPhone launch price ever at the time. The price is even higher in international markets due to currency fluctuations, import fees and sales taxes. An instrumental version of the song Keep On Lovin’  by MagnusTheMagnus was used in the reveal of the device, and the song "Best Friend" by Sofi Tukker was featured in the introductory film and ads.

An unlocked version of the phone was made available for purchase in the United States on December 5, 2017.

In April 2018, the Federal Communications Commission divulged images of an unreleased gold-colored iPhone X model. As opposed to the space gray and silver color options that the iPhone X ships with, it was divulged that there were initial plans to release a gold option for the device. However, it was put on hold due to production issues.

Apple released a revised B model for the iPhone X that fixed NFC issues for users in Japan, China, and the United States.

Specifications

Hardware

Display 
The iPhone X has a 5.85 inch (marketed as 5.8 inch) OLED color-accurate screen that supports DCI-P3 wide color gamut, sRGB, and high dynamic range, and has a contrast ratio of 1,000,000:1.

The Super Retina display has the True Tone technology found on the iPad Pro, which uses ambient light sensors to adapt the display's white balance to the surrounding ambient light.

The iPhone X does not feature the variable 10-120 Hz "ProMotion" technology used in the displays of the second-generation iPad Pro until the launch of the iPhone 13 Pro in 2021.
OLED screen technology has a known negative trend of "burn-in" effects, in which particular elements consistently on the screen for long periods of time leave a faint trace even after new images appear. Apple acknowledged that its OLED screens were not excluded from this issue, writing in a support document that "This is also expected behavior".

Greg Joswiak, Apple's vice president of product marketing, told Tom's Guide that the OLED panels Apple used in the iPhone X had been engineered to avoid the over-saturation of colors that using OLED panels typically results in, having made color adjustments and subpixel-level refinements for crisp lines and round corners. For out-of-warranty servicing for damages not relating to manufacturing defects, screen repairs of iPhone X cost US$279, while other damage repairs cost US$549.

Color options 
The iPhone X has two color options; silver and space gray. The sides of the phone are composed of surgical-grade stainless steel to improve durability, and the front and back are made of glass. The design is intended to be IP67 water and dust resistant.

Chipsets 
The iPhone X contains Apple's A11 Bionic system-on-chip, also used in the iPhone 8 and 8 Plus, which is a six-core processor with two cores optimized for performance (25% faster than the A10 Fusion processor), along with four cores optimized for efficiency (70% faster than the previous generation). It also features the first Apple-designed graphics processing unit and a Neural Engine, which powers an artificial intelligence accelerator.

Biometric authentication 
Face ID replaces the Touch ID authentication system. The facial recognition sensor consists of two parts: a "Romeo" module that projects more than 30,000 infrared dots onto the user's face, and a "Juliet" module that reads the pattern. The pattern is sent to the Secure Enclave in the A11 Bionic chip to confirm a match with the phone owner's face. By default, the system will not work with eyes closed, in an effort to prevent unauthorized access but this requirement can be disabled in settings.

Cameras 
The iPhone X has two cameras on the rear. One is a 12-megapixel wide-angle camera with f/1.8 aperture, with support for face detection, high dynamic range and optical image stabilization. It is capable of capturing 4K video at 24, 30 or 60 frames per second, or 1080p video at 30, 60, 120 or 240 frames per second. A secondary, telephoto lens features 2× optical zoom and 10× digital zoom with an aperture of f/2.4 and optical image stabilization. A Portrait Mode is capable of producing photos with specific depth-of-field and lighting effects. It also has a quad-LED True Tone flash with 2× better light uniformity. Still photos with 6.5 megapixels (3412×1920) can be captured during video recording. iOS 12/13 for the iPhone X did not include Smart HDR or Night Mode, which were kept exclusive to the new iPhone XS/iPhone 11. However, third-party apps brought similar features.

 Front camera
On the front of the phone, a 7-megapixel True Depth camera has an f/2.2 aperture, and features face detection and HDR. It can capture 1080p video at 30 frames per second, 720p video at 240 frames per second, and exclusively allows for the use of Animoji; animated emojis placed on top of the user's face that intelligently react to the user's facial expressions.

 Mono audio
Criticism has been aimed at video footage being recorded with mono audio (only one audio channel), and at a low bit rate of 96 kbit/s, while earlier mobile phones by competing vendors have been recording with stereo audio (two audio channels for spatiality) and higher bit rates, such as the Samsung Galaxy S3 and Sony Xperia S, both unveiled in 2012.

Wireless charging 
iPhone X also supports Qi-standard wireless charging. In tests conducted by MacRumors, the iPhone X's charging speeds varies significantly depending on what types of cables, powerbanks, adapters, or wireless chargers are used.

Software 

Due to its different screen layout, iOS developers are required to update their apps to make full use of the additional screen real estate. Such changes include rounded corners, sensor "notch" at the top of the screen, and an indicator area at the bottom for accessing the home screen. Apple published a "Human Interface Guidelines" document to explain areas of focus, and discouraged developers from attempting to mask or call special attention to any of the new changes. Additionally, text within the app needs to be configured to properly reference Face ID rather than Touch ID where the authentication technology is used on iPhone X. In anticipation of the release of the phone, most major apps were quickly updated to support the new changes brought by iPhone X, though the required changes did cause delayed app updates for some major apps.

The traditional home button, found on all previous devices in the iPhone lineup, has been removed entirely, replaced by touch-based gestures. To wake up the device, users can tap the display or use the side button; to access the home screen, users must swipe up from the bottom of the display; and to access the multitasking window, users must swipe up similarly to the method of accessing the home screen, but stop while the finger is in the middle of the screen, causing an app carousel to appear.

The iPhone X originally shipped with iOS 11 preinstalled at launch. It received iOS 12 on September 17, 2018, and is compatible with iOS 13, which was released on September 19, 2019. It received iOS 14 on September 16, 2020, and iOS 15 on September 20, 2021. On September 12, 2022, it became compatible with iOS 16.

Reception

General reviews 

The iPhone X received positive reviews. Its display and build quality were strongly praised, and the camera also scored positively on tests. However, the sensor housing "notch" at the top of the screen and the introduction of an all-new authentication method were polarizing for critics and consumers. The notch was heavily mocked by users on social media, although app developers responded either neutrally or positively to the changes it brought to the user experience in their apps and games. Face ID facial recognition was praised for its simple setup, but criticized for requiring direct eyes on the screen, though that option can be disabled within the system preferences.

iPhone X's rear camera received an overall rating of 97 from DxOMark, a camera testing company, short of the highest score of 99, awarded to Samsung's Galaxy S9+ smartphone. Google's Pixel 2 received a rating of 98. Consumer Reports, a non-profit, independent organization aiming to write impartial reviews of consumer products, ranked iPhone X below iPhone 8 and iPhone 8 Plus, as well as below Samsung's Galaxy S8, S8+ and Note 8, due to less durability and shorter battery life, although it praised the X's camera as "the highest-rated smartphone camera" it had ever tested.

Chris Velazco of Engadget praised the display, writing that, in his experience, the sensor "notch" goes from being "weird at first" to not being noticeable due to action in videos usually happening in the center. The build quality was given particular acclaim, being called "a beautifully made device" with the construction that "seamlessly" connects the front and back glass with the stainless-steel frame. Velazco noted that the new gesture-based interaction takes time to get used to, particularly the Control Center being moved from the bottom to the top right of the display. The camera, processor performance, and battery life were also given positive thoughts.

Nilay Patel of The Verge also praised the display, calling it "polished and tight" and "bright and colorful". He criticized the repeated lack of a headphone jack, the device's fragility despite Apple's claims of durability, and the sensor notch, calling it "ugly". Patel highlighted the fact that apps required updates to fit the new screen, writing that not all popular apps had received updates by the time of the review, resulting in some apps with "huge black borders" resembling iPhone 8. He especially criticized the positioning of the sensor notch while holding the phone in landscape mode, causing the notch to go "from being a somewhat forgettable element in the top status bar to a giant interruption on the side of the screen". The cameras were given positive feedback for maintaining detail in low-light. Patel particularly praised Animoji, calling it "probably the single best feature on the iPhone X", writing that "they just work, and they work incredibly well". Finally, he wrote that Face ID was the whole foundation of iPhone X, and stated that it "generally works great", though acknowledging the occasional misstep, in which users must "actively move the phone closer to your face to compensate". He specifically criticized the limited range of Face ID, with authentication only working when holding the phone 25–50 centimeters away from the face.

The cost of repairing an iPhone is also very large compared to its predecessors. If the iPhone X is damaged by user damage (not a manufacturing defect), screen repairs cost US$279, and other repairs like replacing iPhone X batteries are more expensive.

In a heavily negative review, Dennis Green of Business Insider significantly criticized the impossible one-handed use of iPhone X, writing that the new gestures to use the phone, such as swiping from the top down to access notifications and the Control Center, did not work when using the phone with only one hand due to not being able to reach the top. His review sparked outrage among Twitter users, many of whom used condescending tones, which Green reasoned as "I don't know whether the anger was directed toward me out of loyalty to Apple or to justify their own choice to spend $1,000 on a phone. It was obvious that much of the criticism came from people who had never used the phone".

Macworlds Roman Loyola praised the Face ID authentication system, writing that the setup process was "easy" and that its system integration was "more seamless" than the Touch ID fingerprint authentication of the past. That said, Loyola did note the "half-second" slower unlocking time than Touch ID as well as needing to look directly at the screen, making it impossible to unlock with the phone next to the user on a desk.

Face ID security and privacy concerns 
Face ID has raised concerns regarding the possibility of law enforcement accessing an individual's phone by pointing the device at the user's face. United States Senator Al Franken asked Apple to provide more information on the security and privacy of Face ID a day after the announcement, with Apple responding by highlighting the recent publication of a security white paper and knowledge base detailing answers.

Inconsistent results have been shown when testing Face ID on identical twins, with some tests showing the system managing to separate the two, while other tests have failed.

However, despite Apple's promise of increased security of Face ID compared to the Touch ID fingerprint authentication system, there have been multiple media reports indicating otherwise. The Verge noted that courts in the United States have granted different Fifth Amendment rights in the United States Constitution to biometric unlocking systems as opposed to keycodes. Keycodes are considered "testimonial" evidence based on the contents of users' thoughts, whereas fingerprints are considered physical evidence, with some suspects having been ordered to unlock their phones via fingerprint. Many attempts to break through Face ID with sophisticated masks have been attempted, though all have failed. A week after iPhone X was released, Vietnamese security firm Bkav announced in a blog post that it had successfully created a $150 mask that tricked Face ID, though WIRED noted that Bkav's technique was more of a "proof-of-concept" rather than active exploitation risk, with the technique requiring a detailed measurement or digital scan of the iPhone owner's face, putting the real risk of danger only to targets of espionage and world leaders.

Additionally, Reuters reported in early November 2017 that Apple would share certain facial data on users with third-party app developers for more precise selfie filters and for fictional game characters to mirror real-world user facial expressions. Although developers are required to seek customer permission, are not allowed to sell the data to others nor create profiles on users nor use the data for advertising, and are limited to a more "rough map" rather than full capabilities, they still get access to over 50 kinds of facial expressions. The American Civil Liberties Union (ACLU) and the Center for Democracy and Technology raised privacy questions about Apple's enforcement of the privacy restrictions connected to third-party access, with Apple maintaining that its App Store review processes were effective safeguards. The "rough map" of facial data third-parties can access is also not enough to unlock the device, according to Reuters. However, the overall idea of letting developers access sensitive facial information was still not satisfactorily handled, according to Jay Stanley, a senior policy analyst with the ACLU, with Stanley telling Reuters that "the privacy issues around of the use of very sophisticated facial recognition technology for unlocking the phone have been overblown. ... The real privacy issues have to do with the access by third-party developers".

Sensor housing controversy 
Much of the debate about the iPhone X has revolved around the design of the sensor housing, dubbed "notch" by the media, at the top of the display. The Outline described it as "a visually disgusting element", and The Verge posted a report focusing on public criticism and people mocking Apple's "odd design choice", but not every reviewer was equally negative in their opinions. Third-party iOS developers interviewed by Ars Technica said that, despite the work of restructuring design elements in their apps, the notch did not cause any problems, with some even arguing that the notch was a good push to simplify their designs. Just two weeks after iPhone X's release, Apple approved a "notch remover" app through the App Store, that places black bars across the top of the home screen to make the notch visually disappear. The approval was done despite the company's user interface guidelines discouraging developers from specifically masking the design. iPhone X was not the first device with a notch; both the Essential Phone and Sharp Aquos S2 were announced before it and had a display notch, albeit much smaller, but the iPhone X arguably popularized it.

Issues

Early activation issues 
In November 2017, early adopters of the new phone reported that they were experiencing activation issues on certain cellular carriers, most notably AT&T. AT&T announced within hours that the issue had been fixed on their end, and a spokesperson for the Verizon carrier told the media none of its customers were affected despite some reports of problems.

Cold weather issues 
In November 2017, iPhone X users reported on Reddit that the device's screen would become unresponsive after experiencing rapid temperature drops. Apple released the iOS 11.1.2 update on November 16, 2017, fixing the issue.

Forbes contributor Gordon Kelly reported in March 2018 that over 1,000 users experienced problems using camera flash in cold weather, with the problem being fixed in a later software update.

Cellular modem differences 
Apple has been engaged in a legal battle with Qualcomm over allegedly anti-competitive practices and has been dual-sourcing cellular modem chips to reduce reliance on the semiconductor manufacturer. Starting with iPhone 7 in 2016, Apple has used about half Qualcomm modem chips and half Intel. Professional measurement tests performed by wireless signal testing firm Cellular Insights indicated that, as in the previous-gen iPhone 7, Qualcomm's chips outperform Intel's in LTE download speeds, up to 67% faster in very weak signal conditions, resulting in some sources recommending the purchase of an unlocked iPhone X or one bought through cellular carrier Verizon, in order to get the models featuring the faster Qualcomm modem. Additionally, CNET reported in September 2017 that the new iPhone models, including X, 8 and 8 Plus, do not have the ability to connect to the next-generation of wireless LTE data connection, despite 10 new Android devices, including flagships from main smartphone competitor Samsung, all having the capability to do so. While Apple's new smartphones have support for "LTE Advanced", with a theoretical peak speed of 500 megabits per second, the Android models have the ability to connect to "Gigabit LTE", allowing theoretical speeds up to 1 gigabit per second, doubling Apple's speed.

NFC problems 
After releasing the iPhone X in Japan and China, customers experienced issues related to the phone's NFC while trying to access public transit smart card readers. In April 2018, Apple released a revision to the iPhone X, that included a vastly improved NFC chip. This solved the problem of NFC reader errors in most cases. Previously around 1 out of 3 NFC attempts would fail after initial reports. This issue also affected users in America.

Display Module Replacement Program 
Apple has determined an issue with certain iPhone X devices where the display wouldn't respond to the user's touch, due to a component that might fail on the display module. Apple stated that they will repair the affected devices free of charge, so long as the device is under 3 years old.

See also 
 List of iOS devices
 History of iPhone
 Comparison of smartphones
 Timeline of iPhone models

References

External links 

  (archived)

Computer-related introductions in 2017
IOS
Mobile phones introduced in 2017
Mobile phones with multiple rear cameras
 
Mobile phones with 4K video recording
Mobile phones with pressure-sensitive touch screen
Discontinued flagship smartphones